Gulf Coast: A Journal of Literature and Fine Arts is a literary magazine from Houston, Texas. Founded in 1986 by Donald Barthelme and Phillip Lopate, Gulf Coast was envisioned as an intersection between the literary and visual arts communities. As a result, Gulf Coast has partnered with the University of Houston's Creative Writing Program, the Museum of Fine Arts, Houston, and the Menil Collection to showcase some of the most important literary and artistic talents in the United States. Faculty editors past and present include Mark Doty (1999–2005), Claudia Rankine, (2006) and Nick Flynn (2007–present). The magazine publishes poetry, fiction, and creative nonfiction.

In 2007, Heather McHugh chose David Shumate's Drawing Jesus, which first appeared in Gulf Coast, for The Best American Poetry 2007, and Stephen King listed Peter Bognanni's The Body Eternal and Sandra Novack's Memphis, again premiering in Gulf Coast, among the 100 Distinguished Stories in The Best American Short Stories 2007. Gulf Coast featured artists Robyn O'Neil and Amy Blakemore have been featured in the Whitney Biennial.

History

The magazine was originally named Domestic Crude (1983–1985), a name that nodded to the major industry of the Houston area. It was a 64-page (magazine-formatted) student-run publication, with editorial advising coming from Lopate, who also contributed work to the first issues.

In 1986, the name Gulf Coast: A Journal of Literature and Fine Arts was adopted. After some experimenting, the magazine found its dimensions and, eventually, its audience. The print magazine comes out each April and October.

Gulf Coast is still student-run. The magazine seeks to promote and publish quality literature in our local and national communities while simultaneously teaching excellence in literary publishing to graduate and undergraduate students. Being committed to providing a variety of literary approaches and voices, all of the editorial positions are two-year terms, thus ensuring a regular turnover in the specific personality and style of the magazine.

In addition to literature, Gulf Coast explores the visual arts. Each issue features two artists, along with short essays on the work from the art editor.

Gulf Coast Prize
Each year, the magazine presents the Gulf Coast Prizes in Poetry, Fiction, and Nonfiction. Outside judges name the winners, who each receive a $1,500 honorarium and are published in the magazine's Winter/Spring issue; two runners-up in each genre will each receive a $250 second prize. Past judges for the prizes include Eula Biss, Eavan Boland, Terrance Hayes, Susan Howe, Antonya Nelson, and Natasha Trethewey.

Barthelme Prize
Gulf Coast also awards the annual Donald Barthelme Prize for Short Prose which awards $1,000 and publication to one prose poem, micro-essay, or short story of five hundred words or less. The Barthelme Prize was inaugurated by editors emeriti Sean Bishop and Laurie Cedilnik in 2008. Past judges for the Barthelme Prize include Beckian Fritz Goldberg and Mary Robison.

See also
List of literary magazines

References

External links
Gulf Coast: A Journal of Literature and Fine Arts website
Gulf Coast Blog
Gulf Coast in The Washington Post
"Journal of the Week" for Fiction Writer's Review
"No Need to Boast": Gulf Coast in The Review Review

Literary magazines published in the United States
Biannual magazines published in the United States
Magazines established in 1986
Magazines published in Texas
Mass media in Houston
University of Houston